Deoxyribonuclease I (usually called DNase I), is an endonuclease  of the DNase family coded by the human gene DNASE1.
DNase I is a nuclease that cleaves DNA preferentially at phosphodiester linkages adjacent to a pyrimidine nucleotide, yielding 5'-phosphate-terminated polynucleotides with a free hydroxyl group on position 3', on average producing tetranucleotides. It acts on single-stranded DNA, double-stranded DNA, and chromatin. In addition to its role as a waste-management endonuclease, it has been suggested to be one of the deoxyribonucleases responsible for DNA fragmentation during apoptosis.

DNase I binds to the cytoskeletal protein actin. It binds actin monomers with very high (sub-nanomolar) affinity and actin polymers with lower affinity. The function of this interaction is unclear. However, since actin-bound DNase I is enzymatically inactive, the DNase-actin complex might be a storage form of DNase I that prevents damage of the genetic information. This protein is stored in the zymogen granules of the nuclear envelope and functions by cleaving DNA in an endonucleolytic manner. 

At least six autosomal codominant alleles of the gene DNASE 1 have been characterized, DNASE1*1 through DNASE1*6, and the sequence of DNASE1*2 represented in this record. Mutations in this gene, as well as factor inactivating its enzyme product, have been associated with systemic lupus erythematosus (SLE), an autoimmune disease. A recombinant form of this protein is used to treat one of the symptoms of cystic fibrosis by hydrolyzing the extracellular DNA in sputum and reducing its viscosity. Alternate transcriptional splice variants of this gene have been observed but have not been thoroughly characterized.



In genomics
In genomics, DNase I hypersensitive sites are thought to be characterized by open, accessible chromatin; therefore, a DNase I sensitivity assay is a widely used methodology in genomics for identifying which regions of the genome are likely to contain active genes

DNase I Sequence Specificity
It has been recently reported that DNase I shows some levels of sequence specificity that may depend on experimental conditions. In contrast to other enzymes which have high substrate specificity, DNase I certainly does not cleave with an absolute sequence specificity. However, cleavage at sites that contain C or G at their 3' end is less efficient.

References

Further reading

External links
 

EC 3.1.21